The 1950–51 season was Colchester United's ninth season in their history and their first ever season in the Football League, competing in the Third Division South, the third tier of English football. Alongside competing in the Third Division South, the club also participated in the FA Cup. The club ended the league season in 16th-position, while they exited the FA Cup in the first round following a defeat to Bournemouth & Boscombe Athletic.

Season overview
Colchester's first–ever game in the Football League was against their old Southern League rivals Gillingham at Priestfield Stadium on 19 August 1950. A crowd of 19,542 witnessed the 0–0 draw between the sides. Five days later, Bob Curry scored the U's first–ever Football League goal during a 1–1 draw at Swindon Town, but it was not until 31 August that the Layer Road crowd were able to enjoy its first Football League goal for the home side. Arthur Turner, the season's top–scorer with 15 goals, struck five minutes into a 4–1 win in the return game with Swindon. Colchester remained unbeaten in their first seven games, a run that equalled a record for new clubs entering the Football League set by Aberdare Athletic in 1921–22.

After occupying second position in the Third Division South table, the U's suffered a slump in form, losing nine of the next ten games. They finished the season in 16th-position, averaging 10,571 through the Layer Road turnstiles. It would be the only season that Layer Road would host a five-figure season average.

Players

Transfers

In

 Total spending:  ~ £6,800

Out

Match details

Third Division South

Results round by round

League table

Matches

FA Cup

Squad statistics

Appearances and goals

|-
!colspan="14"|Players who appeared for Colchester who left during the season

|}

Goalscorers

Clean sheets
Number of games goalkeepers kept a clean sheet.

Player debuts
Players making their first-team Colchester United debut in a fully competitive match.

See also
List of Colchester United F.C. seasons

References

General
Books

Websites

Specific

1950-51
English football clubs 1950–51 season